Schweik's Awkward Years or Schweik's Years of Indiscretion (German: Schwejk's Flegeljahre) is a 1964 Austrian comedy film directed by Wolfgang Liebeneiner and starring Peter Alexander, Rudolf Prack and Gunther Philipp. It is based on the novel The Good Soldier Schweik by Jaroslav Hasek.

It was shot at the Rosenhügel Studios in Vienna. The film's sets were designed by the art directors Fritz Jüptner-Jonstorff and Alexander Sawczynski.

Synopsis
Shortly before the First World War, the son of a Prague butcher is called up for military service in the Austro-Hungarian Army of Emperor Franz Joseph, proving to be a very incompetent recruit.

Cast
 Peter Alexander as Josef Schwejk
 Rudolf Prack as Major Ferdinand Hruschkowitz
 Gunther Philipp as Anton Loschek, Profos
 Lotte Ledl as Anna Pospischil, Stubenmädchen
 Hannelore Auer as Helene Hruschkowitz
 Susi Nicoletti as Amanda Hruschkowitz
 Erwin Strahl as Oberleutnant Gustl Wiedenstein
 Rolf Kutschera as Hauptmann Pokorny
 Oskar Wegrostek as Frantisek Schwejk
 Franz Muxeneder as Feldwebel Kotorek
 Hans Unterkircher as General
 Inge Toifl as Gräfin Timburg
 Karl Hruschka as Kratochwill, Postbote
 Hugo Gottschlich as Ververka, 2. Profos
 Dany Sigel as Hannelore Pivonka 
 Walter Regelsberger as Oberleutnant Fiala
 Hans Habietinek as Mtula, Rechnungsfeldwebel 
 Raoul Retzer as Stabsarzt 
 Erna Schickl as Roserl

References

Bibliography 
 Von Dassanowsky, Robert. Austrian Cinema: A History. McFarland, 2005.

External links 
 

1964 films
1960s German-language films
Films directed by Wolfgang Liebeneiner
Gloria Film films
Films shot at Rosenhügel Studios
Films set in the 1910s
Films set in Prague
Austrian historical comedy films
1960s historical comedy films
Films based on Czech novels